Pieter Willem Adriaan Mulder (born 19 February 1998), known as Wiaan Mulder, is a South African first-class cricketer. He made his One Day International (ODI) debut for South Africa in October 2017 and his Test debut in March 2019. In domestic cricket, Mulder plays for Imperial Lions (formerly Highveld Lions) and Gauteng. He was born in Johannesburg and educated at St Stithians College. He played age-group cricket for Gauteng from under-13 level onwards.

Domestic career
Mulder made his first-class cricket debut at The Wanderers for Highveld Lions against Cape Cobras in the 2016–17 Sunfoil Series in October 2016 whist still at school. He took seven wickets on debut, including 3/10 in the Cobras first innings. Prior to his debut, he was part of South Africa's squad for the 2016 Under-19 Cricket World Cup. He made his Twenty20 (T20) debut for Highveld Lions in the 2016–17 CSA T20 Challenge in November 2016 and his List A debut in the 2016–17 Momentum One Day Cup in February 2017.

In June 2018, he was named in the squad for the Highveld Lions team for the 2018–19 season. In September 2018, he was named in Gauteng's squad for the 2018 Africa T20 Cup. In May 2019, Mulder signed with Kent County Cricket Club to play in the 2019 County Championship in England. He played in three matches for Kent before being recalled to the South African team, ahead of their international schedule.

In September 2019, he was named in the squad for the Tshwane Spartans team for the 2019 Mzansi Super League tournament. In January 2021, Mulder signed with Leicestershire County Cricket Club to play in domestic cricket in England. In April 2021, he was named in Gauteng's squad, ahead of the 2021–22 cricket season in South Africa.

In November 2021, Mulder was signed by Leicestershire County Cricket Club to play in England during the 2022 season. In July 2022, in the County Championship, Mulder scored his maiden double century in first-class cricket with 235 not out.

International career
In October 2017, he was added to South Africa's ODI squad for their series against Bangladesh and made his international debut on 22 October aged 18.

In February 2018, he was named in South Africa's Test squad for their series against Australia, but did not play and in August 2018 was named in the Twenty20 International (T20I) squad for the one-off match against Sri Lanka, but again did not play in the fixture. In January 2019, he was again named in South Africa's T20I squad, this time for their series against Pakistan, but did not play. In February, Mulder was once again named in South Africa's squad, this time for their Test series against Sri Lanka. He made his Test debut against Sri Lanka on 21 February 2019.

In April 2021, Mulder was added to South Africa's T20I squad for their series against Pakistan. He made his Twenty20 International (T20I) debut for South Africa, against Pakistan, on 16 April 2021. In September 2021, Mulder was named in South Africa's squad for the 2021 ICC Men's T20 World Cup.

References

External links
 

1998 births
Living people
South African cricketers
South Africa Test cricketers
South Africa One Day International cricketers
South Africa Twenty20 International cricketers
Durban's Super Giants cricketers
Leicestershire cricketers
Lions cricketers
Tshwane Spartans cricketers
Cricketers from Johannesburg